Rafael Aparecido Elisbão, known as Rafael Fefo (born February 15, 1985, in Piracicaba, São Paulo) is a Brazilian footballer who currently plays as a defensive midfielder for Guarani in the Brazilian Série A.

Contract
 1 January 2004 to 31 December 2007

References

External links
  CBF
  zerozero.pt
  websoccerclub
  soccerterminal
  Guardian Stats Centre

1985 births
Living people
Brazilian footballers
Association football midfielders
J2 League players
Sport Club Corinthians Paulista players
Gainare Tottori players
Brazilian expatriate footballers
Expatriate footballers in Japan
Footballers from São Paulo (state)